Dragon Ball is a Japanese manga series written and illustrated by Akira Toriyama. The story follows the adventures of Son Goku from his childhood through adulthood as he trains in martial arts and explores the world in search of the seven orbs known as the Dragon Balls, which summon a wish-granting dragon when gathered. Along his journey, Goku makes several friends and battles a wide variety of villains, many of whom also seek the Dragon Balls.
 
The series was serialized as 519 individual chapters in the magazine Weekly Shōnen Jump from December 3, 1984, to June 5, 1995. These chapters were collected by Shueisha into a series of 42 tankōbon volumes; the first released on September 10, 1985, and the last on August 4, 1995. Between December 4, 2002, and April 2, 2004, the manga was re-released in a collection of 34 kanzenban, which included a slightly rewritten ending, new covers, and color artwork from its original magazine run. A sōshūhen edition that aims to recreate the manga as it was originally serialized in Weekly Shōnen Jump with color pages, promotional text, and next chapter previews, was published in 18 volumes between May 13, 2016, and January 13, 2017. There have been two anime adaptations, both produced by Toei Animation; the first, also named Dragon Ball, adapted the first 194 chapters of the manga, while the second is titled Dragon Ball Z and adapted the remaining 325 chapters of the series.

The North American distributing company Viz Media has released all 42 volumes in English. Viz initially titled volumes seventeen through forty-two of the manga Dragon Ball Z to reduce confusion for their readers. They began releasing both series chapter by chapter in a monthly individual single comic book format in 1998, before switching to a graphic novel format in 2000; the last volume of Dragon Ball was released on August 3, 2004, while the last one of Dragon Ball Z was released on June 6, 2006. Between June 2008 and August 2009, Viz re-released both series in a wideban format called "Viz Big Edition", which is a collection of three volumes in one. Between June 2013 and September 2016, they released a new 3-in-1 edition of the series in 14 volumes. This version uses the Japanese kanzenban covers and marks the first time in English that the entire series was released under the Dragon Ball name.

Volume list

Dragon Ball

Dragon Ball Z

Dragon Ball SD
Dragon Ball SD is a colored spin-off manga written and illustrated by Naho Ōishi that has been published in Shueisha's Saikyō Jump magazine since its debut issue released in December 2010. The manga is a condensed retelling of Goku's various adventures as a child, with many details changed, in a super deformed art style, hence the title. After four chapters, the quarterly Saikyō Jump switched to a monthly schedule. The chapters published since the monthly switch have been collected into tankōbon volumes since April 4, 2013.

Dragon Ball Super

Super Dragon Ball Heroes: Ankoku Makai Mission!
 is a manga written and illustrated by Yoshitaka Nagayama. It began serialization in the September 2016 issue of Saikyō Jump, which was released on August 5, 2016. It is a tie-in to the card-based arcade game Super Dragon Ball Heroes. Shueisha began collecting the chapters into tankōbon volumes with the first published on May 2, 2017.

Dragon Ball: That Time I Got Reincarnated as Yamcha!
 is a three-chapter spin-off manga written and illustrated by Dragongarow Lee about a high school boy who wakes up after an accident in the body of Yamcha in the Dragon Ball manga. Knowing what comes later in the story, he trains as Yamcha to make him the strongest warrior. It was serialized in the digital Shōnen Jump+ magazine from December 12, 2016, to August 14, 2017. Shueisha collected the chapters into a single tankōbon volume on November 2, 2017. Viz licensed the series for English publication and released the collected volume on November 6, 2018.

Super Dragon Ball Heroes: Universe Mission!!
 is a manga written and illustrated by Yoshitaka Nagayama. It began serialization in Saikyō Jump on April 6, 2018. It is a tie-in to the card-based arcade game Super Dragon Ball Heroes. Shueisha began collecting the chapters into tankōbon volumes with the first published on May 2, 2019.

Super Dragon Ball Heroes: Big Bang Mission!!!
 is a manga written and illustrated by Yoshitaka Nagayama. It began serialization in Saikyō Jump on April 2, 2020. It is a tie-in to the card-based arcade game Super Dragon Ball Heroes. Shueisha began collecting the chapters into tankōbon volumes with the first published on December 4, 2020.

Super Dragon Ball Heroes: Avatars!!
 is a manga written and illustrated by Yuuji Kasai. It is a tie-in to the card-based arcade game Super Dragon Ball Heroes. It began serialization in Saikyō Jump in August 2021.

Super Dragon Ball Heroes: Ultra God Mission!!!!
 is a manga written and illustrated by Yoshitaka Nagayama. It is a tie-in to the card-based arcade game Super Dragon Ball Heroes. It began serialization in Saikyō Jump on March 4, 2022.

References